Blakely may refer to:

People
 Blakely (surname)

Places in the United States
 Blakely, Georgia
 Blakely Township, Gage County, Nebraska
 Blakely, Pennsylvania
 Blakely Island, Washington
 Port Blakely, Bainbridge Island, Washington

Ships
 USS Blakely, list

See also
Blakeley (disambiguation)